Allen Mountain may refer to:

Allen Mountain (Montana), located in Glacier National Park (U.S.)
Allen Mountain (New York), located in the Adirondack Mountains